The wooden spoon is the imaginary and ironic "award" which is said to be won by the team finishing in last place in the West Australian Football League. No physical wooden spoon award exists, other than those brought by opposition fans to taunt struggling teams, nor is such an award officially sanctioned by the WAFL. However, most betting agencies will take wagers on the wooden spoon.

High School withdrew from the competition due to lack of players two rounds into the inaugural season, and therefore are the inaugural "winners" of the wooden spoon. 
West Perth with a record of 7 win and 14 losses in the 1992 season, have the highest numbers of wins out of all wooden spoon teams since the start of the competition in 1885. 
Perth with a percentage of 92.13% (from 6 wins and 9 losses) in the 1921 season, has the highest percentage out of all wooden spoon teams since the start of the competition in 1885.

Criteria
The team which finishes on the bottom of the ladder wins the wooden spoon. This is determined by:
 Fewest premiership points (four points for a win, two points for a draw)
 Lowest percentage (the ratio of points for to points against if on same numbers of points) (1898–Present)
No countback exists if teams finish equal on points but with a different number of wins.

1885–1897
From 1885 to 1897 teams on the ladder were ranked by competition points, then match points differential (for and against). From 1885 to 1896 only goals scored were included in the total score, and teams were awarded two points for a win and one point for a draw.

Wooden spoons by season

Wooden spoons by club

Bold indicates clubs currently playing in the WAFL.

Longest wooden spoon droughts

Active wooden spoon droughts

References

wooden spoon
wooden spoon
West Australian Football League